Ferny Grove is one of the 89 electoral districts for the Legislative Assembly of Queensland in Australia.  Located in northwest Brisbane, it is named for the suburb of Ferny Grove.  It was first created in 1992, and was represented by Labor from its creation until the 2012 election, in which the LNP won with a 59.5 percent two-party vote.

The election is notable for having decided the 2015 state election.  Labor won the seat back on a swing of 10 percent, just barely what it needed to take the seat off the LNP. However, the Palmer United Party candidate for Ferny Grove, Mark Taverner, was revealed to be an undischarged bankrupt and therefore ineligible to run. The revelation spurred speculation that a by-election would be needed to resolve the seat. However, ABC election analyst Antony Green believed that the Ferny Grove outcome and potential by-election will not affect who forms government. The Ferny Grove tally later indicated that the Palmer candidate did not have an effect on the outcome of the election, dampening chances of the Court of Disputed Returns ordering a by-election.  The Electoral Commission of Queensland initially indicated it would refer the situation to the Court of Disputed Returns.  However, on 13 February, when it declared the results of all outstanding seats, the commission said it would not refer the Ferny Grove result to the court.  This made Ferny Grove the 44th seat won by Labor, formally clearing the way for Labor leader Annastacia Palaszczuk to form a minority government.

Members for Ferny Grove

Election results

References

External links
 Electorate profile (Antony Green, ABC)

Ferny Grove